The Order of the Durrani Empire (Nishan-i-Daulat-i-Durrani) was awarded to British field officers and above during the First Afghan War by Shah Shujah Durrani of Afghanistan in gratitude for his restoration to the throne.

The first investiture of the order was held at a grand durbar in the courtyard of the Harem Serai of the Bala Hissar, Kabul, on the evening of 17 September 1839. At the time there were not enough decorations prepared but on the day those who were not on duty were presented before the king. The result was that there are numerous variations in the stars and medals as many were subsequently made in India and Europe, particularly in the number of pearls on the order.

There were three classes to the order as to emulate the three classes of the Order of the Bath. The first and second classes had both a star and a medal while the third consisted of a medal only. The medal of all three classes had the red/green ribbon of the Ghuznee Medal.

1st Class 

Medal: A gold Maltese cross with eight points terminating in a gold bead on two crossed swords. In the centre is a green flower on a blue enamel ground with the words "durr-i-durran" in Persian script, meaning "pearl of the age", the name attributed to the Durrani dynasty.  The enamel centre is encircled by pearls.

Star: A silver star with a smaller Maltese cross in gold overlaid in the same style as the medal with the addition of a diamond on each arm of the gold cross. There are 17 pearls circling the enamel work.

2nd Class 

Medal: As the 1st class but with 20 pearls encircling the centre.

Star:  A silver star shaped like a Maltese cross with the gold medal overlaid as above but with 18 pearls.

3rd Class 

Medal: As the 1st class but with 14 pearls encircling the centre.

Recipients 
This is not an exhaustive list

1st Class
Lieut. Col. Sir Alexander Burnes
Lieut. General Sir Willoughby Cotton		
Lord Auckland
Lieut. General Sir John Keane
Sir William Hay Macnaghten
Lieut. Col. Sir Claude Martin Wade
Major General Sir Thomas Willshire

2nd Class
Lieut. Col. Robert Arnold
Lieut. Col. JG Beaumgardt
Major A Campbell
Major Patrick Craigie
Major William Garden
Lieut. Col. Keith
Lieut. Col. Macdonald
Major General Sir James Outram
Major General James Parsons
Major Alexander Peat
Major General Abraham Roberts
Major General Sir Robert Henry Sale
Lieut. Col. J Scott
Major General Edward Simpson
Lieut. Col. Stephenson
General Sir Joseph Thackwell
Lieut. Col. George Thomson
Major Elliot D'Arcy Todd
Lieut. Col. Hugh Wheeler

3rd Class
Major General Augustus Abbott
Major William Alexander
Captain William Anderson
Superintending Surgeon James Atkinson
Captain JDD Bean
Colonel David Birrell
Lieut. Col. Bulstrode Bygrave
Lieut. Col. Neil Campbell
Lieut. Col. Charles Carmichael Smyth
Lieut. Col. Richard Carruthers
Major General John Christie
Major CJ Connyngham
Captain Edward Barry Conolly
Lieut. Col. Croker
Lieut. Col. David Cuninghame
Lieut. Col. Charles Robert Cureton
Lieut. Col. Daly
Captain David Davidson
Lieut. Col. William Dennie
Major Deshon
Major General Thomas Douglas
Superintending Surgeon J Forsyth
Major J Fraser
Captain H Garbett
Major C Griffiths
Major Crawford Hagart
Major Henry Hancock
Major John Hay
Lieut. Col. John Herring
Captain Hugh Johnson
General Sir George St Patrick Lawrence
Major Robert Leech
Mr PB Lord
Lieutenant Frederick Mackeson
Lieut. Col. James Maclaren
Lieut. Col. McDowell
Lieut. Col. GHM McGregor
Captain James McGregor
Major Thomas McSherry
Colonel Thomas Monteath
Lieut. Col. Joseph Orchard
Lieut. Col. John Pennycuick
Lieut. Col. William Persse
Lieut. Col. Peter Pew
Major Edward Pottinger
Lieut. Col. Sir HC Rawlinson
Captain James Nathaniel Rind
Lieut. Col. Henry Salter
Captain Edward Sanders
Lieut. Col. Bentham Sandwith
General Sir Richmond Shakespeare
Lieut. Col. LR Stacy
Lieut. Col. Foster Stalker
Major Robert Thomas
Major John Thompson
Lieut. Col. Tronson
Captain Hamilton Wade
Captain A Wall
Major General George Warren
Lieut. Col. John Weston
Lieut. Col. CB	Wheeler
Captain Foster	Wheler
Colonel GP Wymer
Captain AGFJ Younghusband

References 

First Anglo-Afghan War
 
Orders, decorations, and medals of Afghanistan
Awards established in 1839
Campaign medals